Sinocyclocheilus longifinus is a species of ray-finned fish in the genus Sinocyclocheilus.

References 

longifinus
Fish described in 1996